Yukon is an unincorporated community in eastern Texas County, Missouri, United States. It is located at the junction of Route 17 and Route 137, approximately nine miles east of Houston.

A post office called Yukon was established in 1899, and remained in operation until 1998. The community was named after the contemporaneous gold rush in Yukon, Canada.

References

Populated places established in 1899
Unincorporated communities in Texas County, Missouri
Unincorporated communities in Missouri
1900 establishments in Missouri